Play It Loud is the debut studio album by American country music artist Chris Cagle. It features the singles "My Love Goes On and On", "Laredo", "I Breathe In, I Breathe Out", and "Country by the Grace of God".

The disc was originally issued on Virgin Nashville in 2000, minus the tracks "I Breathe In, I Breathe Out" (which was originally cut by David Kersh on his 1998 album If I Never Stop Loving You) and "Are You Ever Gonna Love Me."  After Virgin shut down its country division and Cagle moved to sister company Capitol Nashville in 2001, the album was re-issued with the aforementioned tracks and new album art. The newly added tracks were produced by Chris Lindsey.
Jimmy Wayne would later record Are You Ever Gonna Love Me on his 2003 debut album

Track listing

Personnel
Chris Cagle- lead vocals 
Jon Carroll- electric guitar
Joe Chemay- bass guitar
J.T. Corenflos- electric guitar
Shannon Forrest- drums
Sonny Garrish- steel guitar
Wes Hightower- background vocals
Chris Leuzinger- acoustic guitar
Michael Noble- acoustic guitar
Rex Schnelle- acoustic guitar
Gary Smith- keyboards, piano
Michael Spriggs- acoustic guitar 
Steve Turner- drums
Lonnie Wilson- drums
Robert Wright- bass guitar, acoustic guitar, background vocals
Jonathan Yudkin- mandolin, violin, viola

Chart performance

Weekly charts

Year-end charts

Certifications

References

2000 debut albums
Capitol Records albums
Chris Cagle albums
Virgin Records albums